Matthew Gerard Sweeney (6 October 1952 – 5 August 2018) was an Irish poet. His work has been translated into Dutch, Italian, Hebrew, Japanese, Latvian, Mexican Spanish, Romanian, Slovakian and German.

According to the poet Gerard Smyth: "I always sensed that in the first instance [Sweeney] regarded himself as a European rather than an Irish poet  – and rightly so: like the German Georg Trakl whom he admired he apprehended the world in a way that challenged our perceptions and commanded our attention." Sweeney's work has been considered "barely touched by the mainstream of English writing" and more so by the German writers Kleist, Büchner, Kafka, Grass and Böll, as well as the aforementioned Trakl. According to Poetry International Web, Sweeney would be among the top five most famous Irish poets on the international scene.

Biography
Sweeney was born at Lifford, County Donegal, in 1952. Growing up in Clonmany, he attended Gormanston College (1965–70). He then read sciences at University College Dublin (1970–72). He went on to study German and English at the Polytechnic of North London, spending a year at the University of Freiburg, before graduating with a BA Honours degree in 1978.

He met Rosemary Barber in 1972. They married in 1979. Two offspring – daughter Nico and son Malvin – were produced before the couple went their separate ways in the early 21st century. Having lived in London for many years until 2001, Sweeney separated from Rosemary and went to live in Timișoara (Romania) and Berlin (Germany). In 2007, he met his partner, Mary Noonan, and in early 2008 he moved to Cork to live with her there.

Work
Sweeney produced numerous collections of poetry for which he won several awards. His novels for children include The Snow Vulture (1992) and Fox (2002). He authored a satirical thriller, co-written with John Hartley Williams, and entitled Death Comes for the Poets (2012).

Bill Swainson, Sweeney's editor at Allison and Busby in the 1980s, recalls: "As well as writing his own poetry, Matthew was a great encourager of poetry in others. The workshops he animated, and later the residencies he undertook, were famous for their geniality and seriousness and fun. Sometime in the late 1980s I attended one of these workshops in an upstairs room of a pub in Lamb's Conduit Street, Bloomsbury, where the poems were circulated anonymously and carefully read and commented on by all. Around the pushed-together tables were Ruth Padel, Eva Salzman, Don Paterson, Maurice Riordan, Jo Shapcott, Lavinia Greenlaw, Michael Donaghy, Maura Dooley and Tim Dooley." Sweeney later had residencies at the University of East Anglia and London's Southbank Centre, among many others. He read at three Rotterdam Poetry Festivals, in 1998, 2003 and 2009.

His final year saw the publication of two new collections: My Life As A Painter (Bloodaxe Books) and King of a Rainy Country (Arc Publications), inspired by Baudelaire's posthumously published Petits poèmes en prose. Having been diagnosed with motor neuron disease the previous year (a fate that had earlier befallen a sister of his), Sweeney died aged 65 at Cork University Hospital on 5 August 2018, surrounded by family and friends. He had continued writing up until three days before he died. In an interview shortly before his death he was quizzed on his legacy, to which he gave the response: "Mostly what awaits the poet is posthumous oblivion. Maybe there will be a young man in Hamburg, or Munich, or possibly Vienna, for whom my German translations will be for a while important – and might just contribute to him becoming a German language poet with Irish leanings." Among those attending a special ceremony on 8 August 2018 at the Triskel Arts Centre in Cork city to celebrate Sweeney's life were fellow poets Jo Shapcott, Thomas McCarthy, Gerry Murphy, Maurice Riordan and Padraig Rooney. On 9 August 2018, Sweeney was buried in Clonmany New Cemetery in County Donegal.

Awards
 1984: New Statesman Prudence Farmer Award
 1987: Cholmondeley Award
 1999: Arts Council Writers' Award
 2001: Arts Council of Ireland Writers' bursary
 2007: T. S. Eliot Prize (shortlist)
 2008: Poetry Now Award (shortlist) for his collection Black Moon
 2011: The Steven Kings Award 
 2012: Maria Elsa Authors and Poets Award
 2014: Piggot Poetry Prize (for Horse Music)
 Elected a member of Aosdána

Works
Poetry
 
 
 
 
 
 
 
 
  (Canadian edition, A Picnic on Ice, Signal Editions, Véhicule Press, 2002)
 
 
 
 
 
 
 King of a Rainy Country, Arc Publications, September 2018
Contributor to A New Divan: A Lyrical Dialogue Between East and West, Gingko Library, 2019. 
Editor
 (with Jo Shapcott) 
 (with Ken Smith and Felix Post) 
 
 

Novel
  Satirical crime novel, co-written with John Hartley Williams

Criticism
  With John Hartley Williams

See also
List of University of Freiburg people

References

External links
 Official website
 Ireland – Matthew Sweeney at Poetry International Web (with poem audio files)
 Matthew Sweeney at the Poetry Archive
 Some Sweeney poems at Blackbox Manifold, Issue: No. 2 (January 2009)
 Review of The Night Post.
 Sheridan, Colette. "Matthew Sweeney: 'I prefer not to dwell on my inevitable demise'" (interview), Irish Examiner, 23 April 2018.

1952 births
2018 deaths
Alumni of University College Dublin
Alumni of the University of North London
Aosdána members
Deaths from motor neuron disease
Neurological disease deaths in the Republic of Ireland
Irish children's writers
Irish male poets
People from Lifford
University of Freiburg alumni
20th-century Irish poets
20th-century Irish male writers
21st-century Irish poets
21st-century Irish male writers